P.J. Ryan (born 1946 in Carrick-on-Suir, County Tipperary) is a former Irish sportsperson.  He played hurling with his local club Carrick Davins and with the Tipperary senior inter-county team from 1968 until 1975.

He won a senior All-Ireland medal in 1971.

Playing career

Club
Ryan played his club hurling with his local Carrick Davins club and enjoyed much success.  He won back-to-back senior county titles in 1966 and 1967.  Ryan won a Munster club title in 1966.

Inter-county
Ryan first came to prominence on the inter-county scene as a member of the Tipperary under-21 hurling team in the early 1960s.  He won a Munster title in this grade in 1965, however, Tipp were later beaten by Wexford in the All-Ireland final.  Two years later in 1967 Ryan was captain of the under-21 team.  That year he collected a second Munster title before later winning an All-Ireland medal following a victory over Dublin in the championship decider.

By the late 1960s Ryan was a regular on the Tipperary senior inter-county team.  He won his first senior Munster title in 1968 as Tipp trounced Cork in the provincial decider.  Ryan's side later took on Wexford in the All-Ireland final and looked to be cruising to victory.  At half-time they led by eight points, however, the Leinstermen fought back to win the game by 5-8 to 3-12.  Three years later in 1971 Ryan captured a second senior Munster title as Tipp had a one-point win over Limerick courtesy of a last-minute free by Michael 'Babs' Keating.  Tipp later played Kilkenny in the first All-Ireland final to be broadcast in colour by Raidió Teilifís Éireann.  In a high-scoring game and in spite of Eddie Keher scoring a record 2-11, Tipp won on a score line of 5-17 to 5-14.  Ryan claimed his sole senior All-Ireland medal that day.  He continued as a member of the senior team until 1975.

Provincial
Ryan also lined out with Munster in the inter-provincial hurling competition.  He won Railway Cup titles in 1969 and 1970.

References 

1946 births
Living people
Carrick Davins hurlers
Tipperary inter-county hurlers
Munster inter-provincial hurlers
All-Ireland Senior Hurling Championship winners